Big Sampson Cay Airport  is a private use airport located near Big Sampson Cay, the Bahamas.

See also
List of airports in the Bahamas

References

External links 
 Airport record for Big Sampson Cay Airport at Landings.com

Airports in the Bahamas